Baphala homoeosomella is a species of snout moth in the genus Baphala. It was described by Zeller in 1881, and is found in Cuba, the Virgin Islands, Panama, Guyana, Colombia and Brazil.

The wingspan is 11–16 mm. Adults are brownish gray with weakly contrasted transverse dark markings on the forewings.

The larvae feed on scale insects of the Saissetia, Ceroplastes and Toumayella genera.

References

Moths described in 1881
Phycitinae